Naval Base Alexishafen (Naval Base Alexishafen-Madang) was a United States Navy base built during World War II at Alexishafen, north of the city of Madang in New Guinea. The base was built by the US Navy Seabees starting June 13, 1944 as part of the New Guinea campaign of the Pacific War. The base was built at the request of the Seventh Amphibious Force of the United States Seventh Fleet to support the many boats patrolling the area. The US Navy built a  boat repair depot including Auxiliary floating drydocks. The base was closed in January 28, 1945.

History
In May 1944, the US Navy's 7th Amphibious Force requested a base at Alexishafen to provide repair and logistical support for the many boats operating off the north shores of New Guinea. Alexishafen and Madang were liberated on April 26, 1944, by the Australian Army 30th Battalion in the Battle of Madang. Alexishafen's Bostrem Bay offered excellent fleet anchorage. The US Navy began using Bostrem Bay on April 27, 1944, when a destroyer Anchored at Alexishafen. Construction started on June 13, 1944, with the arrival of 200 troops with the US Navy's Seabee 91st Construction Battalion. The troops and supplies had arrived from Naval Base Finschhafen and Naval Base Milne Bay. Base facilities were built on Alexishafen south peninsula, Megas Island and Ulimal Island. All construction was completed on August 17, 1944. Australian had a base at Madang, including a capture runway, Madang Airfield. The Australians built a seaplane base in Madang Bay, used by the US Navy also. By November 1944 the Alexishafen base was too far behind the current Navy action and parts of the base were moved to more forward bases. On December 25, 1944, 80 troops from the 91st Construction Battalion packed up parts of the base to be shipped out to forward bases. The US Navy closed the base on January 28, 1945. The Alexishafen water-supply system was transferred to the Royal Australian Navy.

Bases and facilities
Madang:
Madang Bay fleet Anchorage at 
Madang Airfield Australian, used by US Army and US Navy also. 
Madang Seaplane Base, RAAF used by US Navy also
Fleet Post Office FPO# 928 SF Madang

Alexishafen:
Bostrem Bay - Sek Harbor fleet Anchorage at 
Alexishafen boat repair depot 
Alexishafen freshwater supply system for base and ships
Two 3,500-ton drydock type AFD 
USS Achilles (ARL-41) and USS Remus (ARL-40) repair ships in Sek Harbor
USS Culebra Island (ARG-7) engine repair ship  in Sek Harbor
USS Rigel (AD-13) destroyer tender in Sek Harbor
USS Midas (ARB-5) repair ship
Seabee Camp
Seabee depot
Supply Depot
Repair Depot
Repair base camp, barracks and mess hall
Power plant
PT boat Base, including PT-341
Machine shops
Ammunition depot
Fuel Tank farm
Megas Island, base support facilities at  
Ulimal Island, base support facilities

See also

 US Naval Advance Bases
Naval Base Port Moresby
Naval Base Milne Bay
Naval Base Mios Woendi
Naval Base Lae
US Naval Base New Guinea

References

External links
youtube, Battle for New Guinea 1942-1945 
youtube, Madang and Alexishafen
youtube, Madang New Guinea
youtube, Australian troops advance in Madang, New Guinea. 

Naval Stations of the United States Navy
World War II airfields in the Pacific Ocean Theater
Airfields of the United States Navy
Military installations closed in the 1940s
Closed installations of the United States Navy